Long Meadows is a historic home located near Hagerstown, Washington County, Maryland, United States.  It is a two-story, brick and fieldstone dwelling, historically painted yellow with green trim. In 1739, Thomas Cresap was granted  which he named Long Meadows, where he is said to have erected a stone and log fort over a spring near the Marsh Run. Stones from the fort are said to have been used in the construction of the barn wall located on the property.

Long Meadows was listed on the National Register of Historic Places in 1978.

View of LongMeadows from SE corner of property

References

External links
, including photo from 1974, at Maryland Historical Trust

Houses on the National Register of Historic Places in Maryland
Houses completed in 1908
Houses in Hagerstown, Maryland
National Register of Historic Places in Washington County, Maryland
1908 establishments in Maryland